Mount Lamongan or Mount Lemongan is a small stratovolcano located between the massif Tengger caldera complex and Iyang-Argapura volcano complex in East Java, Indonesia. The volcano is surrounded by maars and cinder cones. The volcano's high point is locally named as Gunung Tarub. Lake-filled maars including Ranu Pakis, Ranu Klakah and Ranu Bedali, located on the eastern and western flanks. The northern flanks are dominated by dry maars.

See also 

 List of volcanoes in Indonesia

References 

Stratovolcanoes of Indonesia
Volcanoes of East Java
Maars of Indonesia
Holocene stratovolcanoes